The 2012 Marburg Open was a professional tennis tournament played on hard courts. It was the third edition of the tournament which was part of the 2012 ATP Challenger Tour. It took place in Marburg, Germany between 25 June and 1 July 2012.

ATP entrants

Seeds

 1 Rankings are as of June 18, 2012.

Other entrants
The following players received wildcards into the singles main draw:
  Constantin Christ
  Robin Kern
  Kevin Krawietz
  Julian Lenz

The following players received entry from the qualifying draw:
  Markus Eriksson
  Uladzimir Ignatik
  Nils Langer
  Tim Puetz

Champions

Singles

 Jan Hájek def.  Andreas Haider-Maurer, 6–2, 6–2

Doubles

 Mateusz Kowalczyk /  David Škoch def.  Denis Matsukevich /  Mischa Zverev, 6–2, 6–1

External links
Official website

Marburg Open
Marburg Open
2012 in German tennis